Adesmia balsamica is a rare species of flowering plant in the legume family, Fabaceae. It belongs to the sub-family Faboideae. A. balsamica is a small shrub which exudes a fragrant balsamic aroma. The species is found in portions of South America, with an example location being La Campana National Park in Chile.

See also

 Adesmia resinosa

Line notes

References
 C. Michael Hogan (2008) Chilean Wine Palm: Jubaea chilensis, GlobalTwitcher.com, ed. N. Stromberg
 Ferdinand von Mueller. 1891. Select extra-tropical plants: readily eligible for industrial culture, page 19 of 594 pages

balsamica